The Foyn Coast is that portion of the east coast of the Antarctic Peninsula between Cape Alexander and Cape Northrop. It was discovered in 1893 by a Norwegian expedition under Captain Carl Anton Larsen, who named it for Svend Foyn, a Norwegian whaler of Tønsberg whose invention of the grenade harpoon greatly facilitated modern whaling.

References 

 
Coasts of Graham Land